Gertrude Winnige-Barosch (born 19 January 1929) was an Austrian gymnast. She competed at the 1948 Summer Olympics and the 1952 Summer Olympics.

References

External links
 

1929 births
Possibly living people
Austrian female artistic gymnasts
Olympic gymnasts of Austria
Gymnasts at the 1948 Summer Olympics
Gymnasts at the 1952 Summer Olympics
Place of birth missing (living people)
20th-century Austrian women